Phthalimidoperoxycaproic acid (ε- or 6-(phthalimido)peroxyhexanoic acid, abbreviated as PAP) is a synthetic organic peroxy acid derived from caprolactam and phthalic anhydride. The compound is mainly used as a preformed bleaching agent, alternatively to or together with hydrogen peroxide, in moderate laundry conditions of pH and temperature. It is also used as a tooth whitening agent. PAP is a white odorless crystalline powder at room temperature. It is slightly soluble in water and a strong oxidizer.

References 

Peroxy acids
Phthalimides